Laoag Cathedral, canonically known as Saint William's Cathedral (Spanish: Catedral de San Guillermo) is a church in Laoag City, Ilocos Norte, Philippines. The current church was built in 1612 by Augustinian friars to replace a wooden chapel. It also serves as the seat or central church of the Roman Catholic Diocese of Laoag.

History
The first church of Laoag was made of wood and thatch when the Augustinians established the parish in 1580. The foundations of the current church was laid on 1612. It was damaged by fire in 1843 and was restored from 1873 to 1880 by the Obras Publicas under Engineer Antonio de la Camara and Father Santiago Muniz. The church was occupied by the revolutionists in 1898, and by the American forces in 1899. The ownership of the church was contested by the Aglipayans from the Roman Catholic from which the Catholic church won ownership. The church facade was renovated by adding lime plaster in 1936. It became a cathedral when the Diocese of Laoag was created in 1961. The church was again renovated from 1971 to 1972. It was slightly damaged by an earthquake in 1983.

Features

The church is known for its Italian Renaissance design. It also has an unusual two-storey façade, supported by two pairs of columns on each side of the arched entrance. The top of the façade holds a recessed niche that showcases the image of the city's patron saint, San Guillermo el Ermitaño. It has windows made from capiz with wrought iron screens.

It has a main retablo and two smaller ones on its sides. The lower level of the huge retablo contains the image of Saint William, the parish's patron saint.

Sinking Bell Tower
The church is also famous for its "Sinking Bell Tower", which sinks into the ground at a rate of an inch a year. It has survived several minor earthquakes since its construction, causing scholars to label it an Earthquake Baroque style structure. It is made of locally manufactured bricks joined by molasses and juice of sablot leaves mixed with lime and sand, and reinforced with four massive columns on each corner and a winding stairway leading to the belfry. It used to have a large clock on the tower's western face.

Notes

Bibliography

External links

Roman Catholic cathedrals in the Philippines
Roman Catholic churches in Ilocos Norte
Buildings and structures in Laoag
Marked Historical Structures of the Philippines
Spanish Colonial architecture in the Philippines
1612 establishments in New Spain
Churches in the Roman Catholic Diocese of Laoag